Stompers are battery-powered toy cars that use a single AA battery and feature four-wheel drive. They are driven by a single motor that turns both axles. They were the first battery-powered, electric, true 4WD toys. Stompers were created in 1980 by A. Eddy Goldfarb and sold by Schaper Toys. Later, in the United Kingdom, Corgi Toys marketed identical toys in Corgi labeled packaging called Trekkers but made by Schaper. Genuine Stompers were sold by various companies around the globe and were also made by Schaper. There were similar products manufactured by Soma and LJN (Rough Riders). Both companies were involved in lawsuits by Goldfarb and Schaper. Settlements were made and the companies continued their line of toys. As of 2019, Goldfarb continues to live and work at his design studio in Southern California.

History of production

Generation I (Schaper)

Stompers debuted in 1980. Schaper's 1980 catalog showed five Stomper trucks: the Chevrolet K-10 Scottsdale, Chevrolet Blazer, Dodge Warlock, Ford Bronco, and Jeep Honcho. The Stunt Set and Wild Mountain play sets were the only other Stompers products in that year's catalog. The earliest Stompers have clips inside the body that attach to the sides of the chassis; they are known as "side clips". They also came with a set of foam tires. Nineteen eighty-one brought five new Stomper trucks: the Chevrolet LUV, Datsun Li'l Hustler, Jeep Renegade, Subaru BRAT, and Toyota SR5. The Stunt Set and Wild Mountain set also returned, though different pieces were shown in the 1981 catalog. The short-lived Stomper SSC Super Cycles also debuted in 1981. The trucks were also sold with an additional set of rubber tires so that they could be driven outdoors.

The Jeep Cherokee and Scrambler were the new four-wheel-drive trucks for 1982. Fun x4s ("Exclusively designed from the real street hot-rods!") debuted in 1982, consisting of the AMC (American Motors) SX/4, two Chevrolets (van and 1956 Nomad), Jeep CJ, Subaru hatchback, and Volkswagen Baja Bug. The Work x4s also debuted in 1982; these were Ford C-Series trucks with bucket-lift, cement-mixer, dumper, and wrecker bodies. Four semi-tractors—Freightliner and Kenworth Aerodyne COEs and Mack and Peterbilt conventional—rounded out the new vehicles. The Official Competition Pull Set was also new in 1982. Badlands, Devil Mountain, and Wild Country sets replaced the earlier play sets; the SSC line continued largely unchanged.

Generation II (Schaper)
1983 was a year of major change for Stompers. The core line of 4x4 vehicles was given a second speed, free-wheeling when the vehicle was off, and wider tires. The Stomper II Authentic featured new graphics and fender flares. The older single-speed Stompers remained, positioned as an economical alternative to the new three-speed Stompers; the single-speeds now had no chrome and decal graphics. New Road Rods were "inspired by souped-up versions of today's most popular customized vehicles." The semis were renamed Road Kings and joined by Heavy Haulers, with wreckers or dump bodies. Wilderness Campers featured interchangeable tonneau covers and camper shells and could be had with a trailer carrying a boat or motorcycle. A bulldozer and front-end loader joined the Work x4s line, and the amphibious Water Demons and military-themed Mobile Force lines were introduced. most vehicles also included a Stunt Wheel, a fifth wheel that attached to the vehicle's underside and allowed it to be driven on two of its main wheels. The Wild Country play set was replaced by the Wild Canyon set, while the Badlands Trail and Devil Mountain set continued. The Stomper Super Cycles continued largely unchanged.

1984 saw the introduction of Stomper Super Dragsters, "six supercharged neutron-powered dragsters" claimed to be "the fastest vehicles known to man." The three-wheeled All-Terrain Cycles were also new for 1984. The Wilderness Campers came with a trailer as standard and added a power take-off winch, and were renamed Workhorses. The Water Demons line expanded to six vehicles, and there were also new semi-trucks. Several new play sets were added, for both the Stomper II and Mobile Force lines, and two vehicles were dropped from the Road Rods line; these were repackaged into the Custom Kit and Deluxe Custom kit, allowing children to build a Stomper themselves.

1985 brought the Monster 4x4s, much larger vehicles powered by C-cell batteries. Also new were the Speedsters, sports cars with steerable wheels and their own special track, and Zanees, which features huge engines that shook and made noise. Stomper Overdrives featured an over-running clutch mechanism. Futuristic vehicles made up the new Future Force line. A four-wheeled ATV joined the All-Terrain Cycles line, and two new Super Dragsters were added. The rest of the line continued largely unchanged, though the Competition Pull Set was dropped.

New for 1986 was the Trendsetters line. Mini 4x4s, which were powered by a single AAA cell, was also new. The Future Force line gave way to the Mega Star line. A Gator Rally set was new for the Speedsters line, and the All-Terrain Trail breaker joined the ATVs in the new All-Terrain Vehicles line. The Zanees, Super Dragsters, and Stomper Super Cycles disappeared, and other lines continued largely unchanged in what would be Schaper's final year.

Generation (Tyco)
Tyco took over Stomper production in 1987. The only new line was Diving Devils, which worked on land, on water, and under water. Water Demons, Speedsters, 4x4s, Mini 4x4s, and All-Terrain Vehicles continued, as did the larger Stomper Bully monster truck. The 4x4s now included "road blocks," small pieces that allowed the creation of an obstacle course. Stomper Overdrives were modified to become Stomper R/C. Tyco continued this line-up almost completely unchanged for 1988. After 1988, Stompers would not be produced until 1992.

Generation (DreamWorks)
Produced in 1992. New models included a military line called Stormers, Earthquake Alley and Authentic.

Generation (Peachtree Playthings)
Produced from 1997 to 1999. New models included Road Kill, Work Force, Battle Ready, X-Treme Street. The company moved onto a new product "Shifters" a copycat Stomper that was 1/4" wider.

Generation (Tinco Toys)
Produced in 2001 and 2002. (Tinco was actually the production company for all of the licensed manufacturers.)

References

External links
Stomper 4x4
Stompers Corner
Schaper Stomper Checklist

Toy cars and trucks